In organometallic chemistry, sigma-bond metathesis is a chemical reaction wherein a metal-ligand sigma bond undergoes metathesis (exchange of parts) with the sigma bond in some reagent.  The reaction is illustrated by the exchange of lutetium(III) methyl complex with a hydrocarbon (R-H):
(C5Me5)2Lu-CH3  +  R-H  →   (C5Me5)2Lu-R  +  CH4

This reactivity was first observed by Patricia Watson, a researcher at duPont. 

The reaction is mainly observed for complexes of metals with d0 configuration, e.g. complexes of Sc(III), Zr(IV), Nb(IV), Ta(V), etc. f-Element complexes also participate, regardless of the number of f-electrons. The reaction is thought to proceed via cycloaddition. Indeed, the rate of the reaction is characterized by a highly negative entropy of activation, indicating an ordered transition state.  For metals unsuited for redox, sigma bond metathesis provides a pathway for introducing substituents.  

The reaction attracted much attention because hydrocarbons are normally unreactive substrates, whereas some sigma-bond metatheses are facile.  Unfortunately the reaction does not readily allow the introduction of functional groups.  It has been suggested that dehydrocoupling reactions proceed via sigma-bond metathesis.

See also
 C-H activation

References

Organometallic chemistry